Hua Ngiu railway station is a railway station located in Noen Makok Subdistrict, Phayuha Khiri District, Nakhon Sawan. It is on the Northern Line of the State Railway of Thailand.

Train services
 Ordinary 201/202 Bangkok-Phitsanulok-Bangkok
 Ordinary 207/208 Bangkok-Nakhon Sawan-Bangkok
 Local 401/402 Lop Buri-Phitsanulok-Lop Buri

References 
 
 

Railway stations in Thailand